Vice Admiral Frederick Charles Bryan Robinson (3 April 1836 – 18 January 1896) was a Royal Navy officer who went on to be Commander-in-Chief, East Indies Station.

Naval career
Born the son of Admiral Hercules Robinson, Robinson became a lieutenant in 1855. Promoted to Commander in 1863, he served in that rank in HMS Rinaldo from 1868 to 1871. He was appointed Commander-in-Chief, East Indies Station in 1891. He later became a Fellow of the Royal Geographical Society.

Family
In 1864 he married Willamina Bradley; in 1889 he married for a second time, to Alice Tew.

References

1836 births
1896 deaths
Royal Navy vice admirals
Fellows of the Royal Geographical Society